Saripalle is a village in West Godavari district of the Indian state of Andhra Pradesh. It is located in Ganapavaram mandal of Eluru revenue division.

References 

Villages in West Godavari district